Gmina Rokietnica may refer to either of the following rural administrative districts in Poland:
Gmina Rokietnica, Subcarpathian Voivodeship
Gmina Rokietnica, Greater Poland Voivodeship